Florida Carry is a non-profit organization that promotes gun rights in Florida.
The organization was formed in 2011 to organize gun lobby groups to legally oppose some forms of gun legislation in Florida. In 2011, the organization successfully supported a bill that allowed out-of-state purchases of long guns. In 2012, they supported a successful bill that allowed honorably discharged veterans to obtain a gun license regardless of age. In 2013, the group opposed a bill that would have required anger management classes for ammunition buyers. In 2014, the group supported an unsuccessful bill that would have allowed citizens to transport unlicensed guns in their vehicles during evacuations. In the same year, they successfully lobbied for a bill that allowed legal immunity to people who used a gun for self-defence during a crime.

History
Florida Carry, Inc. was formed in 2011 for the purpose of coordination of the activities of some gun rights advocates and to provide a legal entity capable of lobbying the state legislature and file legal challenges in state and federal courts.

Legislative activity
Florida Carry has actively lobbied the Florida Legislature and Governor on self-defense, firearms, and defensive weapons related topics.

2011 Session
During the 2011 Florida Legislative Session Florida Carry's legislative work focused on the legalization of Open Carry and amending Florida's 1987 Firearms Preemption Statute to create a private right of action against state actors who violate the law. HB 517 and its companion bill, SB 234, initially provided for the licensed Open Carry of firearms, licensed carry of firearms and defensive weapons on college and university campuses, storage of firearms in private vehicles, the out of state purchase of Long Guns, and Florida Department of Agriculture and Consumer Services finger printing services for concealed weapons and firearms license applications. Opposed by the Florida Retail Federation and the Florida Sheriffs Association, the bills passed without the Open Carry and Campus Carry provisions. HB 45 and its companion bill, SB 402, provided for Firearms Preemption law enforceability and expansion of the preemption to include substantially all state and local government agencies of Florida. The amended law provides penalties for government officials who knowingly & willfully violate Florida's Firearms Preemption Statute, allows for the collection of attorney's fees, fines, and damages. HB 45 Passed and became effective October 1, 2011.

2012 Session
In 2012 Florida Carry's lobbying efforts centered on the passage of HB 463 and SB 998. The bills provided for concealed carry licensure of current military service members and honorably discharged veterans to obtain a license to carry regardless of age or duty station. The bill also requires that fingerprint cards be accepted from military police and provost so that service members stationed overseas can complete their applications. The bills passed the Florida House and Senate unanimously.

2013 Session
The group opposed a Florida bill that would have required anger management courses for ammunition buyers.

2014 Session
During the 2014 Florida Legislative Session Florida Carry supported SB 296 in an attempt to create exceptions to criminal penalties for carrying or transporting firearms in public, with or without a license, during mandatory evacuations. Opposed by the Florida Sheriffs Association, the bill failed to pass. 
Florida Carry also supported changes to Florida's self-defense laws to allow immunity from prosecution or civil action for the threatened use of force in response to a criminal attack, an exception to mandatory minimum sentencing laws in cases of imperfect self-defense with a firearm, expungement of arrest records in cases of lawful self-defense.

HB 89 became law on June 20, 2014.

References

Gun rights advocacy groups in the United States
Non-profit organizations based in Florida
Organizations established in 2011